Sergeant York or Alvin C. York was one of the most-decorated American soldiers in World War I.

Sergeant York may also refer to:
Sergeant York (film), a 1941 biographical film about Alvin C. York
Sergeant York (horse)
M247 Sergeant York, a self-propelled anti-aircraft weapon
Sgt. York Trophy, a trophy in American football
York (explorer), a slave who was a key participant in the Lewis and Clark expedition who was posthumously granted the rank of honorary sergeant in the United States Army

See also
 York (disambiguation)
 York (surname)